While Heaven Wept (often abbreviated as WHW) was an American epic doom metal band based in Dale City, Virginia. The primary writer and overall engine of the band was mainman Tom Phillips.  Their melodic, classically influenced style could be compared to bands such as Solitude Aeturnus and Solstice (the latter of which Tom Phillips is a former member); however, 2003's acclaimed Of Empires Forlorn saw the band branching out into a variety of metal and progressive styles.  This trend continues on their 2009 album, Vast Oceans Lachrymose, and on their 2011 album, Fear of Infinity.

While Heaven Wept's lyrics have dealt with sorrowful matters, namely, personal loss and despondency.

Members

Current 
 Tom Phillips (ex-Solstice, ex-Twisted Tower Dire, ex-Brave) - vocals, guitars, keyboards
 Jim Hunter (Twisted Tower Dire, October 31, Revelation) - bass
 Scott Loose (Brave, Human Theory) - guitars
 Trevor Schrotz (Brave) - drums
 Michelle Schrotz (Brave) - keyboards, vocals
 Rain Irving (Altura) - vocals
 Jason Lingle (Altura) - keyboards, vocals

Guests

 Mark Zonder (Warlord, ex-Fates Warning) - drums on "Suspended At Aphelion"
 Victor Arduini (ex-Fates Warning) - lead guitar on "Suspended At Aphelion"
 Christopher Ladd - classical guitar on "Suspended At Aphelion"
 Mark Shuping - cello and violin on "Suspended At Aphelion"
 Mickey Rey Diaz - vocals live at ROAM, November 10, 2018

Former 
 Jason Gray (ex-Forty Days Longing) - drums
 Angelo Tringali (Slough Feg) - guitars (live)
 Fred Provoost (ex-Whispering Gallery) - keyboards (live)
 Jon Paquin - drums
 Scott Waldrop (Twisted Tower Dire) - guitars
 Jim Murad (ex-Twisted Tower Dire) - bass
 Wiley Wells (Novembers Doom, Those Are They) - keyboards
 Danny Ingerson (ex-Dysrhythmia (band)) - bass
 Kevin Hufnagel (Dysrhythmia (band), Gorguts) - guitar
 Gabe Funston - bass
 Phil Bloxam - (ex-Hellion - DC underground metal band) - drums
 Jake Bodnar - keyboards
 Kenny Thomas - guitars, vocals
 "Diamond" Dave - bass
 James Whorton - drums
 Jason Stone - bass
 David Bornhauser - guitars
 Tony Garcia - guitars
 Chad Peevy - bass
 Brendan "Ber" Galvan - vocals
 Chris Galvan - guitars
 Jim Chappell - drums

Discography
 Into the Wells of Sorrow 7-inch - Open Eye Records (1994)
 Lovesongs of the Forsaken - Promo (1994)
 Lovesongs of the Forsaken EP - Sinistrari Records (1995)
 The Mourning split 7-inch with Cold Mourning, Game Two Records 1997
 Sorrow of the Angels - Eibon Records (1998)
 Chapter One: 1989-1999 2x LP Retrospective - Metal Supremacy Records (2002)
 The Drowning Years 7-inch Single - Maniacal Records (2002)
 Of Empires Forlorn - Eibon Records (2003 Limited Edition), Rage of Achilles Records (2003), Rock Machine Records (2005 South American Pressing)
 Vast Oceans Lachrymose - Cruz Del Sur Music (2009)
 Vessel 7-inch Single - High Roller Records / Maniacal (2010)
 Triumph:Tragedy:Transcendence - Cruz Del Sur Music (2010)
 The Arcane Unearthed 2x LP Retrospective - High Roller Records (2011)
 Fear of Infinity - Nuclear Blast Records (2011)
 Suspended at Aphelion - Nuclear Blast Records (2014)

Compilation appearances
 Scenecubator (features "The Mourning") - Open Eye Records (1994)
 Nightshade Vol.1 (features "Sorrow Of The Angels") - Private Release by Scott DeFusco (Curse Of The Chains 'zine) (1995)
 Funeral Aspects (features "Sorrow Of The Angels") - Private Release by Patrick Walker (Warning) (1995)
 Time Brings Only Sadness (features "Sorrow Of The Angels") - Private Release by Oliver Richling (1995)
 At the Mountains of Madness (features "Into the Wells of Sorrow") - Miskatonic Foundation (1999)
 Knuckletracks XLV (features "The Drowning Years") - Brave Words & Bloody Knuckles Magazine (2002)
 Terrorized V25 (features "The Drowning Years") - Terrorizer Magazine #115 (2003)
 Obskure Sombre Records Doom Fuzz Compilation 2003 (features "The Drowning Years" single version) - Obskure Sombre Records (2003)
 Dark Moon Vol.1 - A Tribute To The Black Spirit (features "Destroyer Of Solace") - More Music and Media GmbH (2011)
 ProgPower USA XII DVD (features "Of Empires Forlorn" and "Voice In The Wind") - ProgPower USA (2012)

References

External links
 While Heaven Wept Official Page 
 Nuclear Blast Records
 Cruz Del Sur Music
 Eibon Records
 Of Empires Forlorn Review

American doom metal musical groups
American progressive metal musical groups
American progressive rock groups
Symphonic rock groups
Heavy metal musical groups from Virginia
Musical groups established in 1989
Nuclear Blast artists
People from Dale City, Virginia